Newbuildings United Football Club is an intermediate-level football club playing in the Northern Ireland Intermediate League in Northern Ireland. The club is based in Newbuildings, County Londonderry.

Honours

Senior honours
North West Senior Cup: 1
2013–14

Intermediate honours
Northern Ireland Intermediate League: 3
2010–11, 2011–12, 2012–13

External links
 nifootball.co.uk - (For fixtures, results and tables of all Northern Ireland amateur football leagues)

Association football clubs in Northern Ireland
Association football in County Londonderry